The Point is a stop on the Luas light-rail tram system in Dublin, Ireland.  It opened in 2009 as the terminus of an extension of the Red Line. Named after the nearby Point Depot, it serves the surrounding Point Village area and is situated in the middle of a plaza at the end of Mayor Street Upper, near Point Square, Host Point Student accommodation, and the 3Arena.

The stop has three platforms.  This allows up to three trams to dwell there during events at the 3Arena, in order to prepare for the influx of passengers leaving the venue at the end of the event.  On average, trams depart every 10 minutes towards the city centre and Tallaght or Saggart.  Immediately to the west of the stop, the two most northern tracks merge into one and the two remaining tracks cross over at a switch diamond.  Trams continue westward along Mayor Street Upper.

The stop is also served by Dublin Bus routes 33D, 33X, 53, 53A, 90, 142, 151, and 747

References

Luas Red Line stops in Dublin (city)